Hattler is a surname and may refer to:

 Christina Hattler, American fashion designer
 Hellmut Hattler (born 1952), German jazz and bass player
 Max Hattler, German video artist and experimental filmmaker